The Utah Genealogical Association (UGA) is a non-profit genealogical society charted by the State of Utah on December 1, 1971.

Publications 
The UGA currently publishes a quarterly journal, Crossroads which was preceded by the Genealogical Journal. Back copies are available to members through the website.

In 1991, the Genealogical Journal published a pair of articles detailing the broad extent of Gustave Anjou's fraudulent genealogies.

See also 
 Utah Genealogical Association website

References 

Genealogical societies in the United States
1971 establishments in Utah